Powidl (or powidel, from Czech povidla) is a fruit spread prepared from the prune plum. Unlike jam or marmalade, and unlike the German Pflaumenmus (plum puree), powidl is prepared without additional sweeteners or gelling agents.

Powidl is cooked for several hours, in order to achieve the necessary sweetness and consistency. The plums used should be harvested as late as possible, ideally after the first frosts, in order to ensure they contain enough sugar.

In Austria, Moravia and Bohemia, powidl is the basis for Buchteln, powidl cake and Germknödel, but it is also used as a sandwich spread. Powidl will keep for a long time, especially if kept in traditional crockery.

Traditionally, large amounts of powidl to be used as a winter store and natural sweetener were prepared in late autumn during a communal event. Since constantly stirring the pot was exhausting work, people took turns, and did easier work in between turns. The Czech term povidla is plural only (the Polish word powidła as well).

References 
Translated from the corresponding article in the German Wikipedia, retrieved February 4, 2005.
Powidl recipe

See also 
Pączki
Lekvar
Apple butter
Varenye

Austrian cuisine
Czech cuisine
Spreads (food)
Plum dishes
Polish cuisine